Katherine Angel is a British academic and writer whose 2012 work of literary non-fiction, Unmastered: A Book on Desire, Most Difficult to Tell, attracted worldwide attention.

Life
Angel was born in Brussels and earned an undergraduate degree in philosophy. She studied at Harvard University on a JH Choate Fellowship, and earned a Ph.D. in the history of psychiatry and sexuality from the University of Cambridge. She has been a postdoctoral fellow in the history of medicine at Warwick University. Angel is currently a lecturer in creative writing at Birkbeck, University of London.

In 2012, Angel published Unmastered: A Book on Desire, Most Difficult to Tell, a literary and experimental meditation on sexual desire. Unmastered attracted international attention.

In 2019, Angel's book Daddy Issues was published by Peninsula Press.

In 2021, Tomorrow Sex Will Be Good Again: Women and Desire in the Age of Consent was published by Verso.

Critical reception
Unmastered garnered generally positive reviews. Talitha Stevenson, writing in The Guardian, noted a "distinctive sensibility" in the book, and wrote admiringly that "a sumptuous picture emerges of Angel's relationship with her partner, and she shows the way love permits the ordinary to snuggle up to the sublime." Stevenson concludes that "Unmastered is a blemished but vigorous testament to a female libido undaunted by the cold shower of self-analysis, or by the bedside interjections of feminist heroines."

Stuart Hammond, writing in Dazed Digital, lauded Unmastered, describing it as "one of those totally out-of-the blue, impossible-to-classify, weird and new and wonderful fiction-ish nonfiction books, which happily come along every so often and make you go, 'Whoa: this is what we need now.'"

Writing in For Books' Sake, Henna Butt observed that Angel's "background has built the confident feminism which pervades Unmastered and seems to bolster her even when other feminists have deemed her views to be unacceptable... Angel illustrates how she has felt feminism, in some instances, enforces precisely the same “shaming and silencing” of women’s sexuality that it seeks to oppose. This is shown through an occasion when Angel listens to Shere Hite and is disappointed to find the disapproval with which penetrative sex with men is discussed."

Kirkus Reviews called Unmastered "[a] revealing look at postmodern feminism and its role in female desire through one woman’s personal anecdotes, meditations and professional research," and went on to say that "Angel provides an intelligent examination of how today’s women satiate their needs and desires." Observing that Angel "struggles with her personal convictions regarding love and lust in and out of the bedroom," the reviewer praised the book's "empowering conclusion," and recommended Unmastered as "an unconventional and strikingly lyrical observation of women and their desire to speak regarding the fulfillment of their sexual and emotional needs."

Works

Literary non-fiction
 Unmastered: A Book on Desire, Most Difficult to Tell (2012)
 Daddy Issues (2019)
 Tomorrow Sex Will Be Good Again: Women and Desire in the Age of Consent (2021)

See also
 British literature

References

Sources

External links
 
 Katherine Angel profile on Birkbeck, University of London

21st-century British novelists
21st-century British women writers
British women academics
Living people
Year of birth missing (living people)
Writers from Brussels
Harvard University alumni
Alumni of the University of Cambridge
Academics of Birkbeck, University of London